Dr. Santanu Chaudhuri is a researcher and the director of Manufacturing Science and Engineering, Argonne National Laboratory.

Early life and education
Santanu Chaudhuri was born at Kolkata, India. He attended Santragachi Kedarnath Institution, Howrah and completed B.Sc in Physics, Mathematics, Chemistry from Seth Anandram Jaipuria College with Honors in Engineering Chemistry from Calcutta University. He pursued Ph.D in Computational and Materials Chemistry from State University of New York, Stony Brook. As a graduate student, he received a NATO scholarship to work at Oxford University developing simulation methods for ionic conductors, catalysts, and battery materials.

Career
From 2003–2006, Chaudhuri worked at Brookhaven National Laboratory's Center for Functional Nanomaterials and developed a research program on theory-guided design of hydrogen storage materials for automobile applications. After that he joined Washington State University and served as a Research Associate Professor in the Department of Physics and Astronomy.

In 2014, Chaudhuri moved to the University of Illinois at Urbana-Champaign and subsequently served as the Associate Director of the Applied Research Institute (ARI).He built research program on accelerating Materials Design and Manufacturing using simulation-based process design and predictions of materials performance.

He is currently the Professor in Civil, Materials, and Environmental Engineering Department, at the University of Illinois at Chicago. He is currently director of Manufacturing Science and Engineering, Argonne National Laboratory.

Research interests
He has research interests on Multiscale Modeling, Condensed Matter Theory, Molecular Dynamics. Dr. Chaudhuri leads a research team that specializes in the practical and engineering application of high-performance computing in energy, environment and manufacturing. His research is currently funded by DOE, DHS, NSF, AFOSR, ARL, EPRI, DMDII, GE Global Research, Boeing Company, Ford Motors and FMC Technologies.

References

Year of birth missing (living people)
Living people
Argonne National Laboratory people
Seth Anandram Jaipuria College alumni
Scholars from Kolkata
Stony Brook University alumni
University of Calcutta alumni